Chiyoki Ikeda (born March 11, 1920 Honolulu, Territory of Hawaii; died March 17, 1960) was listed in the CIA Memorial Wall on  May 14, 1997. Ikeda had possessed dual citizenship, but chose to  renounce his Japanese citizenship in September 1940.

Early life and education
Ikeda graduated from President William McKinley High School in 1938 and attended the University of Hawaiʻi, where he was on the track team for two years. In March 1943, he became a second lieutenant in the United States Army.

Work in the CIA
During the Chinese Civil War, Ikeda was selected for behind-enemy-lines duty in China with the Office of Strategic Services, the World War II forerunner of the Central Intelligence Agency, and was decorated with a Bronze Star. After World War II, Ikeda helped screen Japanese prisoners of war returning to Japan from Siberian camps. Ikeda managed the screening process that attempted to identify POWs who had been trained by the Soviets to act as spies upon their return. He became a captain.

Language ability
Ikeda had excellent command of English and Japanese languages, and basic ability in Chinese and French.

Death
Ikeda died on March 17, 1960, in the plane crash of Northwest Orient Airlines Flight 710 in Indiana while on a temporary duty assignment.

References

1920 births
1960 deaths
People of the Central Intelligence Agency
People of the Office of Strategic Services
American military personnel of Japanese descent
Hawaii Rainbow Warriors track and field athletes
Victims of aviation accidents or incidents in the United States
People from Honolulu
Accidental deaths in Indiana
American expatriates in China
United States Army personnel of World War II
United States Army officers